The 54th Infantry Division is an Infantry division of the Indian Army. The Division was raised as an Infantry Division, but was converted into a Reorganised Amphibious Formation (RAMFOR) in 2011. It is currently the only division of the Indian Army which carries out Amphibious warfare. The division is headquartered at Secunderabad in Telangana and is a part of XXI Corps. The Division is commanded by a Two-star General Officer of the rank of Major General titled General Officer Commanding (GOC).

History
The 54th Infantry Division was raised at Secunderabad on 1 October 1966. Major General SS Maitra, AVSM was the first General Officer Commanding (GOC) the Division. At the time of its raising, the division had three Infantry Brigades and one Artillery Brigade.
47 Infantry Brigade was raised by Brigadier B D Man Singh at Golconda Fort, 91 Infantry Brigade by Brigadier K P Lahiri, VrC at Bolarum and the 54 Artillery Brigade was raised by Brigadier N V Subramaniam at Bowenpally.

Order of battle (ORBAT) during raising
 47 Infantry Brigade
 13th battalion, Jammu and Kashmir Rifles (13 JAKRIF) 
 5th battalion, 3rd Gorkha Rifles (5/3 GR)
 91 Infantry Brigade
 4th battalion, Madras Regiment (4 Madras)
 3rd battalion, Maratha Light Infantry (3 MLI)
 2nd battalion, 5th Gorkha Rifles (Frontier Force) (2/5 GR)
 74 Infantry Brigade
 4th battalion, Sikh Light Infantry (4 Sikh LI)
 5th battalion, Madras Regiment (5 Madras)
 22nd battalion, Maratha Light Infantry (22 MLI)
 54 Artillery Brigade
 7 Field Regiment
 141 Field Regiment
 6 Medium Regiment
 278 Medium Regiment
 1889 Light Regiment

Indo-Pakistani War of 1971

In the event of a war, the 54th Infantry Division was to be part of I Corps, then the only Strike Corps of the Indian Army. The division was commanded by Major General WAG Pinto, the 3rd General Officer Commanding (GOC). The division moved from its peacetime location in Secunderabad to its operational location in the Punjab and was ready by mid-September 1971.

ORBAT 
The ORBAT of the division during the Indo-Pakistani War of 1971 was:
6th battalion, Madras Regiment (6 Madras)
47 Infantry Brigade (Brigadier A P Bhardwaj)
16th battalion, Madras Regiment (16 Madras)
16th battalion, Dogra Regiment (16 Dogra)
3rd battalion, The Grenadiers (3 Granadiers)
74 Infantry Brigade (Brigadier Ujaggar Singh)
8th battalion, The Grenadiers (8 Granadiers)
6th battalion, Kumaon Regiment (6 Kumaon)
9th battalion, Maratha Light Infantry (9 MLI)
91 Infantry Brigade (Brigadier A Handoo)
3rd battalion, Garhwal Rifles (3 Garh Rif)
3rd battalion, 1st Gorkha Rifles (The Malaun Regiment) (3/1 GR)
16 (Independent) Armoured Brigade (Brigadier  A S Vaidya)
4th Horse (Hodson's Horse)
16th Light Cavalry
17 Horse (Poona Horse)
18th battalion, Rajputana Rifles (18 Raj Rif)
90 (Independent) Reconnaissance Squadron (from 17 Horse)
54 Artillery Brigade (Brigadier Avtar Singh)
69 Field Regiment
161 Field Regiment
162 Field Regiment
44 Light Regiment
70 Medium Regiment
41 (Independent) Artillery Brigade

The tasks allotted to the Division were:
 Carry out offensive operations based upon Galar with the ultimate aim of capturing Zafarwal and Dhamtal. 
 While doing so, capture Darman, Bari, Laisar Kalan, Supwal Ditch and Badwal. Be prepared to capture Deoli and Mirzapur, if required. This meant that the Division was to operate between the Degh Nadi and the Karir Nadi.

The Pakistani forces opposite the Division consisted of elements of the 8th Infantry Division. The 24 Infantry Brigade with four battalions (11 Baloch which held the Supwal ditch, 40 Punjab which was deployed east of the Karir Nadi, 24 Punjab which was defending the Basantar Nala), a brigade in Zafarwal area and Reconnaissance elements of 21 Baloch. Apart from these infantry units, Pakistani armour consisted of the 8 Armoured Brigade which had 13th Lancers, 31 Cavalry and 27 Cavalry under it, equipped with M47 Patton and M48 Patton tanks.

The Division crossed the border as planned at 2000 hrs on 6 December and captured the border outposts at Chamnakhurd, Danadout, Galar Tanda, Chak Jangu, Dhandhar, Mukhwal and Buru Chakby 0230 hrs 7 December.

Battle of Basantar

The Battle of Basantar was among the most vital battles in the war. It was one of the greatest tank battles fought by the Indian Army. The Division had the 47 Infantry Brigade, 91 Infantry Brigade and the 74 Infantry Brigade, Poona Horse and one squadron of Hodson's Horse. The date for the Basantar crossing was fixed for night 14/15 December, but was postponed by 24 hours by Gen Pinto. The Battle of Basantar was a decisive Indian victory.

The 47 Infantry Brigade was christened Basantar Brigade after the war.

In what is an Indian Army record, the 54th Infantry Division won as many as 196 gallantry medals in just 14 days of fierce fighting. These include 2 Param Vir Chakras and 9 Mahavir Chakras. The GOC, Maj Gen Pinto was awarded the Param Vishisht Seva Medal.

The Division remained in Pakistan until the Simla Agreement, after which it moved back to Secunderabad in March 1973. A war trophy - a disabled Pakistani M47 Patton Tank was gifted by the Division to the Government of Andhra Pradesh and had it installed on the Tank Bund Road, Hyderabad.

Awards and honours

Operation Pawan

The Division, led by Major General Harkirat Singh, was the first formation to be inducted into Sri Lanka as part of the Indian Peace Keeping Force (IPKF). The Division was grouped with a Mechanised Infantry battalion, a Squadron of Armour and an Air Operation Flight.

ORBAT
Divisional Reserves
 10th battalion, Para Commando (10 Para Cdo)
 65 Armoured Regiment
 91 Infantry Brigade
 5th battalion, Madras Regiment (5 Madras)
 8th battalion, Mahar Regiment (8 Mahar)
 1st battalion, Maratha Light Infantry (1 MLI)
76 Infantry Brigade
47 Infantry Brigade
93 Field Regiment
831 Light Regiment

The Division was in Sri Lanka for over two and a half years and was de-inducted on 20 March 1990.

Awards and honours
During Operation Pawan, the Division earned  a total of 471 awards including 1 Param Vir Chakra, 3 Mahavir Chakras, 4 Uttam Yudh Seva Medals and 32 Vir Chakras.

Other Operations
Operation Parakram
Internal security duties during the Mandal Commission violence and 2002 Gujarat riots.
Humanitarian assistance - Operation Sahayta, Operation Sea Waves, Operation Madad, Operation Megh, Operation, Operation Lehar and Operation Hudhud.

General Officers Commanding

See also
 List of military divisions
 Indian Peace Keeping Force
 Indo-Pakistani War of 1971

Citations

References

Divisions of the Indian Army
Military units and formations established in 1966
1966 establishments in India
Units of the Indian Peace Keeping Force